The Daughters of Isis are the female auxiliary to the Ancient Egyptian Arabic Order Nobles Mystic Shrine, the Prince Hall affiliated Shriners.

Local groups of the Daughters of Isis had been founded in Maryland, Rhode Island and Washington, DC, in the early years of the twentieth century and in 1909 representatives of these locals met with a committee from the Prince Hall Shriners and formally requested the formation of a national organization of female relatives of the Ancient Egyptian Arabic Order Nobles of the Mystic Shrine. This was granted at the annual convention of the Shrine held in Detroit, Michigan, on August 24, 1910. At the group's inception it had twelve courts or local groups.

Local organizations are called Courts and the national organization is called the Imperial Court.

The organizations' rituals are based on the Egyptian legends of Isis.

There were 12,000 members in 184 courts in 1979. Today there are "almost 200 courts located in the United States, Canada, the Bahamas, Germany, Italy, South Korea, and Japan."

References

External links 
 

Organizations established in 1910
Shriners
Prince Hall Freemasonry
African-American women's organizations
Women's masonic organizations
Isis